The USAC Stock Car division was the stock car racing class sanctioned by the United States Auto Club (USAC). The division raced nationally; drivers from USAC's open wheel classes like Indy cars, Silver Crown, sprints, and midgets frequently competed in races and won championships. Several NASCAR drivers raced in USAC Stock Cars at various points in their careers.

In the late 1950s, USAC Stock Cars rivaled NASCAR stock cars with races throughout the Midwestern and Northeastern United States. NASCAR owners Holman-Moody found racing in USAC Stock Cars to be appealing because of USAC's ties to the Indianapolis 500.

History
The stock car class began as a division of the AAA Contest Board. AAA decided to stop sanctioning all racing classes after Bill Vukovich's death at the 1955 Indianapolis 500 was followed closely by the 1955 Le Mans disaster. USAC took over sanction in all of their classes starting in 1956.

USAC continued to sanction the Stock Car division until 1984 but the series had lost some luster as the events were frequently co-sanctioned with ARCA. The final championship in 1984 was scheduled for three races but only two were run (Springfield and DuQuoin). The third event, part of the 4 Crown Nationals at Eldora Speedway, was rained out and not rescheduled.

After the division ended, many of the drivers moved to other Midwestern series such as the American Speed Association (ASA), ARCA, and ARTGO.

Tracks
USAC Stock Cars raced on dirt tracks, asphalt ovals and road courses. The Milwaukee Mile was regularly on the schedule. The variety of tracks included the dirt at DuQuoin State Fairgrounds Racetrack's oval, Indianapolis Raceway Park's asphalt oval, and the asphalt circle at Langhorne Speedway. The Pikes Peak International Hill Climb was even a stop on the schedule during some seasons.

Drivers

Champions

AAA
1950 Jay Frank
1951 Rodger Ward (National)
1952 Marshall Teague (National)
1953
1954 Marshall Teague (National)
1955 Frank Mundy

USAC
1956 Johnny Mantz (National)
1956 Sam Hanks (Pacific Coast)
1956 Troy Ruttman (Short Track)
1957 Jerry Unser
1958 Fred Lorenzen
1959 Fred Lorenzen
1960 Norm Nelson
1961 Paul Goldsmith
1962 Paul Goldsmith
1963 Don White
1964 Parnelli Jones
1965 Norm Nelson
1966 Norm Nelson
1967 Don White
1968 A. J. Foyt
1969 Roger McCluskey
1970 Roger McCluskey
1971 Butch Hartman
1972 Butch Hartman
1973 Butch Hartman
1974 Butch Hartman
1975 Ramo Stott
1976 Butch Hartman
1977 Paul Feldner
1978 A. J. Foyt
1979 A. J. Foyt
1980 Joe Ruttman
1981 Dean Roper
1982 Dean Roper
1983 Dean Roper
1984 David Goldsberry

Rookies of the Year

Several notable drivers won the USAC Stock Car Rookie of the Year award. Indy car champions Al Unser (1967) and Joe Leonard (1964) were named the Rookie of the Year. Leonard had moved to stock cars after winning several AMA motorcycle championships. Future NASCAR drivers Dick Trickle (1968), Dave Watson (1977), Joe Ruttman (1978), Rusty Wallace (1979), and Ken Schrader (1980) plus USAC Stock Car champion Butch Hartman (1967) received the award.

References

Stock car racing series in the United States
Stockcar